Bolshoy Bor is a rural locality (a village) in Chekuyevskoye Rural Settlement of Onezhsky District, Arkhangelsk Oblast, Russia. The population was 306 as of 2010. There are 8 streets.

Geography 
Bolshoy Bor is located on the Kodina River, 80 km southeast of Onega (the district's administrative centre) by road. Pavlovsky Bor is the nearest rural locality.

References 

Rural localities in Onezhsky District